Calisto lyceius is a butterfly of the family Nymphalidae. It is endemic to Hispaniola, where it is found in the lowland desert.

The larvae feed on various species of bunch grass.

References

Butterflies described in 1935
Calisto (butterfly)